Foljambe may refer to:

Arthur Foljambe, 2nd Earl of Liverpool (1870–1941), British politician, the 16th and last Governor of New Zealand, and the first Governor-General of New Zealand
Cecil Foljambe, 1st Earl of Liverpool (1846–1907), British politician
Sir Francis Foljambe, 1st Baronet (died 1640), English politician, Member of Parliament for Pontefract
Francis Ferrand Foljambe (1749–1814), English politician, Member of Parliament for Yorkshire, and for Higham Ferrers
Francis Foljambe (Liberal politician) (1830–1917), English politician, Member of Parliament for East Retford
George Foljambe (1856–1920), English cricketer and soldier
Sir Godfrey de Foljambe (1317–1376), English landowner and politician